Strathmerton is a town in Victoria, Australia.

History
Strathmerton Post Office opened on 1 September 1879. In 1888 on the arrival of the railway a Strathmerton Township Post Office opened near the station. In 1891 this was renamed Strathmerton.

The local railway station was opened on the railway to Cobram in 1888, with the line to Tocumwal opened in 1905. The last regular passenger service was in 1993. Before road changes, Strathmerton was known as the intersection of the Goulburn Valley Highway and the Murray Valley Highway and was the northernmost town directly north of Melbourne still in Victoria.

The Kraft factory in Strathmerton was acquired by Bega Cheese in December 2008 with Bega claiming that production will double in the following five years.

Today

The town is served by the Strathmerton Primary School. Other than a few small businesses, the only industries of note are the large Bega Cheese factory and the Booth Transport Milk Transfer Depot.  The surrounding rural area consists of mainly irrigated dairy and fruit farms. There are several beaches and camping spots just to the north of Strathmerton along the Murray River in and adjacent to the Barmah State Forest.

The local football team, Strathmerton Football Club competes in the Picola & District Football League.  The Strathmerton Lawn Bowls Club is a popular social and recreational focal point for locals and visitors.

Golfers play at the course of the Strathmerton Golf Club.

See also
 Strathmerton railway station

References

External links
Strathmerton Primary School
Strathmerton Football Club

Towns in Victoria (Australia)
Shire of Moira